D'Kyla Paige Woolen (born January 8, 2001), known professionally as Kaash Paige (a backronym for Kill All Arrogance, Stop Hatred), is an American singer and songwriter from Dallas, Texas. She is signed to Se Lavi Productions and Def Jam Recordings and managed by Roc Nation. She released her debut extended play Parked Car Convos on November 15, 2019.

Early life 
D'Kyla Paige Woolen was born on January 8, 2001, in Dallas, Texas. She started writing and recording in high school, uploading tracks to SoundCloud, where she quickly gained a local following. She attended Timberview High School in Arlington, Texas.

Career 
By early 2019, Paige had attracted attention from several record labels, and eventually landed a deal with Se Lavi Productions and Def Jam Recordings. The single "Love Songs" went viral on various social media platforms and spent six weeks at the top of Spotify's global viral chart, reaching Billboard's Hot R&B Songs chart. On November 15, 2019, she released her debut EP, Parked Car Convos. The remix of "Love Songs" was released in January 2020 featuring 6lack. In March 2020, she appeared on the track "Euphoria" with Don Toliver and Travis Scott.
Her debut album, Teenage Fever, was released on August 14, 2020.

Influences 
Woolen has cited Erykah Badu, Drake, Mac Miller, Isaiah Rashad, SZA, The Internet, Flatbush Zombies, and Frank Ocean as her musical influences.

Personal life 
Paige identifies as bisexual.

Discography

Studio albums

Extended plays

Singles

As lead artist

As featured artist

Promotional singles

Other charted songs

Guest appearances

References

External links 
 Official website

2001 births
Living people
21st-century American singers
21st-century American women singers
Musicians from Dallas
LGBT African Americans
LGBT rappers
LGBT people from Texas
Bisexual musicians
Bisexual women
African-American women musicians
21st-century LGBT people
21st-century African-American women singers
Alternative R&B musicians